Stratos Voutsakelis (born 28 April 1953) is a Greek football manager.

References

1953 births
Living people
Greek football managers
Apollon Pontou FC managers
Agrotikos Asteras F.C. managers
Olympiacos Volos F.C. managers
Kalamata F.C. managers
Kavala F.C. managers
Ionikos F.C. managers
Doxa Drama F.C. managers
Sportspeople from Thessaloniki